Rajshahi University School (RUS) is a co-educational Bangladeshi school (Grade I-XII) situated in Rajshahi University. It was established in 1966. Admissions are based on an entrance test and a viva-voce (oral examination). The school provides education to its students in Bengali medium under the national curriculum. Students are admitted to the institution in First, Second, Third, Sixth and in Eleventh grade. The school has 3500 students and employs 50 teaching staff and 25 other staff.

History

The college section was formally inaugurated in 1983. The school is controlled by 'Rajshahi University School Ordinance-1983'. The school is administered by the Institute of Education and Research under Rajshahi University.

Admission
Admission into RUS is highly competitive. Applicants have to pass a written test and an oral examination to qualify. Admission tests for first, second and third grade are generally held in December and academic sessions begin in January. Admission procedure for eleventh grade starts soon after the publication of the results of Secondary School Certificate (SSC) examinations (public examination taken by students after completing grade 10) and admission is based on SSC examinations results. In recent years, students securing less than GPA 5 on the scale of 5 in the SSC examinations were not even eligible to apply for admission in the eleventh grade.

Education

Rajshahi University School provides education to its students in the Primary, Secondary and Higher Secondary level in Bengali medium under the national curriculum. Students take SSC (public examination taken by students after completing grade 10) and Higher Secondary Certificate (HSC) examinations (public examination taken by students after completing grade 12) and PSC and JSC . The school has a library with 5000 volumes along with physics, chemistry, computer and biology labs for performing experiments. Bright students participate in mathematics and physics Olympiads.

Curriculum
The school follows the national curriculum. This curriculum includes traditional Primary, secondary and higher secondary school academic subjects. Students of both secondary (9 and 10) and higher secondary (11 and 12) classes have to elect to one of three major groups : Arts/Humanities, Business Studies and Science. Students of grade 10 and 12 are prepared for their SSC and HSC examinations respectively. Selected students of grade 8 are also prepared for their Junior School Certificate.

Library
The library has 5,000 volumes. In addition to the material for studies, there is a collection of fiction, non-fiction and periodicals. Two books may be checked out at a time and they may be kept for a maximum period of two weeks.

Administration
Rajshahi University school is controlled by 'Rajshahi Bisshobiddaloy School Addhyadesh-1983'. The school is administered by The Institute of Education and Research under Rajshahi University. The chief of the administration of the school is the chairman of The Institute of Education and Research of Rajshahi University.

Uniform
All students wear uniform.
 Boys: white shirt and navy blue trouser.
 Girls: navy blue frock, white Payjama and white Orna.

Co-curricular and extra-curricular activities

The program includes football, cricket, volleyball and handball. Special emphasis is being given on literary and cultural activities. To stir cultural awareness among the students, a yearly cultural week is observed with great zeal and enthusiasm by the students of the institution. The cultural week includes Hamd, Nat, Quirat, Debate, Recitation, Music, Drama, Story telling, Caricature etc. students in a large number participate in the said competitions.

The "Debating Society, Rajshahi University School" has participated in national debate competition. A team of debaters participated in BSB Cambrian youth Parliament and won several competitions.

Other clubs include drawing and painting, photography, gardening, pottery, band and junior cadet crops. A colourful wall paper reflecting the thoughts and ideas of students is brought out each term.

The college organises an annual function on 21 February to observe the International Mother Language Day every year. It holds programs on the occasion of Pohela Boishakh, Independence Day, and Victory Day.

On 11 September 2022, 1-minute silence was observed in the regular morning assembly to mourn the death of Queen Elizabeth II of United Kingdom.

Achievements
 Best Education Institution of The Year Award – 1991
 Best Education Institution of The Year Award – 1996
 Best Artist of The Year Award – 2004 (arranged by Bangladesh Sishu Academy)
 Best Girls Guide Team of The Year – 2005
 Best Ranger Team of The Year – 2005
 Runner up of Inter School Debate Festival – 2008 (arranged by Kishor Kantha Pathok Forum)
 Champion of Inter School Debate Festival – 2010 (arranged by Bangladesh Debate Warrirors)

School events and programs
The following events are held regularly in RUS:
Science Festival
Debate (Bengali and English)
Set Speech (Bengali and English)
Extempore Speech (Bengali and English)
Recitation (Bengali and English)
Quiz (Bengali and English)
General Knowledge (Bengali and English)
Music
Wall Magazine (Bengali and English)

School magazine
RUS annually publishes a magazine containing poems, articles, stories, science fiction, and jokes, written by the students, teachers and staff. Barshiki (invigorating or inspiring in Bengali) is the name of the magazine.

References

Schools in Rajshahi District
High schools in Bangladesh
Educational institutions established in 1966
1966 establishments in East Pakistan
Education in Rajshahi